Fort Assunção or Corjuem Fort is a fortress situated  from the village of Aldona on the river island of Corjuem, Goa. It was a military fortress for the defense of Portuguese India. It is smaller than the other forts in Goa, but it gives a good view of the surrounding river and land. It is a protected monument under the Goa, Daman and Diu ancient monuments and archaeological sites and remains act.

Location
The Fort of Corjuem is situated on an island with the same name in Bardez, to the east of the village of Aldona, from which it is separated by the Mapuçá River (a tributary of the Mandovi). It is one of the only two inland forts that are surviving that are made of pitted laterite.

History
The original occupiers of the island around the fort were the Bammons of Sancoale, but it was raided by Marathas (in the late 1600s) who later transferred control to Sawant-Bhonsle of Sawantwadi. Under the Portuguese Viceroy Caetano de Mello e Castro, the control of the island came back under Portuguese India's administration. This fort built in 1705, by the Portuguese, as a defense against Maratha aggression, and was subsequently rebuilt and reinforced by them to boost up defenses along Panjim.
In the eighteenth century, this fort successfully protected the Portuguese from the Bhonsles and the Ranes, who were camped just beyond the Mandovi River.

In the early 1800s, the fort was used as a Military School and had in its defenses a battery of four guns. The fortress defended the town of Corjuem and also has a chapel under the parochial church of Aldona. The fort fell into disuse after the success of Novas Conquistas, as it had lost its purpose as a border defense.

Incidents
The fort also has an interesting incident in which an ambitious Portuguese woman named Ursula e Lancastre, who determined to see the man's world, dressed as a male and took up navigation and military roles. She landed up at Corjuem as a soldier and many years later, voluntarily revealed her gender as she wished to marry a man.

Santuário de Santo António de Lisboa
There is a Shrine dedicated to St. Anthony within the walls of the fort, at its entrance. It is under the ownership of the Parish of Aldona and is regularly patronized and renovated.

References

Portuguese forts
Forts in Goa
Buildings and structures in North Goa district
Buildings and structures completed in 1705
1705 establishments in India
1894 disestablishments in India
1890s disestablishments in Portuguese India
Military installations established in 1705